is a feminine Japanese given name which is also used as a surname.

Possible writings
Satomi can be written using different kanji characters and can mean:
里美, "hometown, beauty"
怜美, "wise, beauty"
聡美, "wise, beauty"
智美, "wisdom, beauty"
理美, "intelligence, beauty"
叡美, "intelligence, beauty"
聖美, "holy, beauty"
The name can also be written in hiragana or katakana.
さと美, "sato, beauty"
サト美, "sato, beauty"
as a surname
里見, "hometown, look"

Satomi Clan 
Satomi clan (里見氏), a Japanese clan originating in the Sengoku period
Satomi Yoshihiro (里美義弘, 1530-1578), a samurai of the Satomi clan
Satomi Yoshiyori (里見義頼, 1543-1587), the son of Yoshihiro
Satomi Yoshiyasu (里見義康, 1573-1603), the son of Yoshiyori and the father of Tadayoshi
Satomi Tadayoshi (里見忠義, 1594-1622), a retainer of the Okubo clan

Places
Satomi, Ibaraki (里美村), a town in Ibaraki prefecture

People

Given name
Satomi Akesaka (聡美), a Japanese voice actress
Satomi Arai (里美, born 1980), a Japanese voice actress
Satomi Hanamura (怜美), a Japanese actress
Satomi Ishihara (さとみ), a Japanese actress
Satomi Ikezawa (理美), a Japanese manga artist
Satomi Kobayashi (聡美), a Japanese actress
Satomi Koike, (里美) Japanese speed skater
Satomi Koorogi (さとみ, born 1962), a Japanese voice actress
Satomi Mitarai (怜美), a 12-year-old Japanese schoolgirl who was murdered by her classmate
Satomi Oka (さとみ), a Japanese actress
Satomi Ono (聡美) Japanese ice hockey player
Satomi Sato (聡美 born 1986), a Japanese voice actress
Satomi Takasugi (さと美), Japanese pop singer
Satomi Watanabe (聡美), Japanese squash player

Surname
Hajime Satomi (里見), the founder of Sammy Corporation
Kana Satomi (里見), Japanese shogi player
Kōtarō Satomi (里見), a Japanese actor
Saki Satomi (里見), Japanese shogi player
Ton Satomi (里美), a Japanese author

Pseudonym
DJ Satomi, an Italian electronic music producer and remixer
Satomi (singer, born 1989) (理美), a Japanese singer
Satomi (singer, born 1993) (さとみ), a Japanese singer

Fictional characters
Satomi Hakase (聡美), a character from Negima! Magister Negi Magi
Satomi Noda (聡美), a character in the film, novel, and manga Battle Royale
Satomi Ozawa (さとみ), a character in the anime and manga series Shadow Star
Satomi Yajima (聡美), a character from the 2D fighting game series Variable Geo
Michiru Satomi (サトミ), a character from the anime series Immortal Grand Prix
Satomi Ito, a powerful Alpha werewolf character and leader of a large werewolf pack on Teen Wolf
Satomi Usagi (里美), a character from Puella Magi Kazumi Magica, a manga spinoff of Puella Magi Madoka Magica

See also
Nansō Satomi Hakkenden (南総里見八犬伝), a Japanese 106 volume epic novel by Kyokutei Bakin
Satomi Hakkenden (里見八犬伝), a 1983 Japanese film directed by Kinji Fukasaku loosely based on the above

Notes 

Japanese feminine given names
Japanese-language surnames